Justice Harris may refer to:

Carleton Harris, associate justice of the Arkansas Supreme Court
Charles Coffin Harris, chief justice of the Supreme Court of The Kingdom of Hawaiʻi
Henry Harris (Rhode Island), associate justice of the Rhode Island Supreme Court
Iverson L. Harris (1805–1876), associate justice of the Supreme Court of Georgia
Ira Harris, justice of the New York Supreme Court and, ex officio, judge of the New York Court of Appeals
John Harris (judge), associate justice of the New Hampshire Supreme Court
K. David Harris, associate justice of the Iowa Supreme Court 
Lawrence T. Harris, associate justice of the Oregon Supreme Court
William Littleton Harris, associate justice of the Supreme Court of Mississippi
William R. Harris, associate justice of the Tennessee Supreme Court